Uchumarca or Uchumarka (Quechua uchu capsicum, marka village) is one of six districts of the province of Bolívar in Peru.

See also
Pirqa Pirqa

References